The People's Commissariat for Internal Affairs, abbreviated NKVD, was the interior ministry of the Soviet Union.

Established in 1917 as NKVD of the Russian Soviet Federative Socialist Republic, the agency was originally tasked with conducting regular police work and overseeing the country's prisons and labor camps. It was disbanded in 1930, with its functions being dispersed among other agencies, only to be reinstated as an all-union commissariat in 1934.

The functions of the OGPU (the secret police organization) were transferred to the NKVD around the year 1930, giving it a monopoly over law enforcement activities that lasted until the end of World War II. During this period, the NKVD included both ordinary public order activities, and secret police activities. The NKVD is known for its role in political repression and for carrying out the Great Purge under Joseph Stalin. It was led by Genrikh Yagoda, Nikolai Yezhov, and Lavrentiy Beria.

The NKVD undertook mass extrajudicial executions of citizens, and conceived, populated and administered the Gulag system of forced labour camps. Their agents were responsible for the repression of the wealthier peasantry. They oversaw the protection of Soviet borders and espionage (which included carrying out political assassinations), and enforced Soviet policy in communist movements and puppet governments in other countries, most notably the repression and massacres in Poland in 1937 and 1938 to crush opposition and establish political control.

In March 1946 all People's Commissariats were renamed to Ministries. The NKVD became the Ministry of Internal Affairs (MVD).

History and structure 

After the Russian February Revolution of 1917, the Provisional Government dissolved the Tsarist police and set up the People's Militsiya. The subsequent Russian October Revolution of 1917 saw a seizure of state power led by Lenin and the Bolsheviks, who established a new Bolshevik regime, the Russian Soviet Federative Socialist Republic (RSFSR). The Provisional Government's Ministry of Internal Affairs (MVD), formerly under Georgy Lvov (from March 1917) and then under Nikolai Avksentiev (from ) and Alexei Nikitin (from ), turned into NKVD (People's Commissariat of Internal Affairs) under a People's Commissar. However, the NKVD apparatus was overwhelmed by duties inherited from MVD, such as the supervision of the local governments and firefighting, and the Workers' and Peasants' Militsiya staffed by proletarians was largely inexperienced and unqualified. Realizing that it was left with no capable security force, the Council of People's Commissars of the RSFSR established a secret political police, the Cheka, led by Felix Dzerzhinsky. It gained the right to undertake quick non-judicial trials and executions, if that was deemed necessary in order to "protect the Russian Socialist-Communist revolution".

The Cheka was reorganized in 1922 as the State Political Directorate, or GPU, of the NKVD of the RSFSR. In 1922 the USSR formed, with the RSFSR as its largest member. The GPU became the OGPU (Joint State Political Directorate), under the Council of People's Commissars of the USSR. The NKVD of the RSFSR retained control of the militsiya, and various other responsibilities.

In 1934, the NKVD of the RSFSR was transformed into an all-union security force, the NKVD (which the Communist Party of the Soviet Union leaders soon came to call "the leading detachment of our party"), and the OGPU was incorporated into the NKVD as the Main Directorate for State Security (GUGB); the separate NKVD of the RSFSR was not resurrected until 1946 (as the MVD of the RSFSR). As a result, the NKVD also took over control of all detention facilities (including the forced labor camps, known as the Gulag) as well as the regular police. At various times, the NKVD had the following Chief Directorates, abbreviated as "ГУ"– , .

ГУГБ – государственной безопасности, of State Security (GUGB)
ГУРКМ– рабоче-крестьянской милиции, of Workers and Peasants Militsiya (GURKM)
ГУПВО– пограничной и внутренней охраны, of Border and Internal Guards (GUPVO)
ГУПО– пожарной охраны, of Firefighting Services (GUPO)
ГУШосДор– шоссейных дорог, of Highways (GUŠD)
ГУЖД– железных дорог, of Railways (GUŽD)
ГУЛаг– Главное управление исправительно-трудовых лагерей и колоний, (GULag)
ГЭУ  – экономическое, of Economics (GEU)
ГТУ  – транспортное, of Transport (GTU)
ГУВПИ – военнопленных и интернированных, of POWs and interned persons (GUVPI)

Yezhov era

Until the reorganization begun by Nikolai Yezhov with a purge of the regional political police in the autumn of 1936 and formalized by a May 1939 directive of the All-Union NKVD by which all appointments to the local political police were controlled from the center, there was frequent tension between centralized control of local units and the collusion of those units with local and regional party elements, frequently resulting in the thwarting of Moscow's plans.

During Yezhov's time in office, the Great Purge reached its height.  In the years 1937 and 1938 alone, at least 1.3 million were arrested and 681,692 were executed for 'crimes against the state'. The Gulag population swelled by 685,201 under Yezhov, nearly tripling in size in just two years, with at least 140,000 of these prisoners (and likely many more) dying of malnutrition, exhaustion and the elements in the camps (or during transport to them).

On 3 February 1941, the 4th Department (Special Section, OO) of GUGB NKVD security service responsible for the Soviet Armed Forces military counter-intelligence, consisting of 12 Sections and one Investigation Unit, was separated from GUGB NKVD USSR.

The official liquidation of OO GUGB within NKVD was announced on 12 February by a joint order No. 00151/003 of NKVD and NKGB USSR. The rest of GUGB was abolished and staff was moved to newly created People's Commissariat for State Security (NKGB). Departments of former GUGB were renamed Directorates. For example, foreign intelligence unit known as Foreign Department (INO) became Foreign Directorate (INU); GUGB political police unit represented by Secret Political Department (SPO) became Secret Political Directorate (SPU), and so on. The former GUGB 4th Department (OO) was split into three sections. One section, which handled military counter-intelligence in NKVD troops (former 11th Section of GUGB 4th Department OO) become 3rd NKVD Department or OKR (Otdel KontrRazvedki), the chief of OKR NKVD was Aleksander Belyanov.

After the German invasion of the Soviet Union (June 1941), the NKGB USSR was abolished  and on July 20, 1941, the units that formed NKGB became part of the NKVD. The military CI was also upgraded from a department to a directorate and put in NKVD organization as the (Directorate of Special Departments or UOO NKVD USSR). The NKVMF, however, did not return to the NKVD until January 11, 1942.  It returned to NKVD control on January 11, 1942, as UOO 9th Department controlled by P. Gladkov. In April 1943, Directorates of Special Departments was transformed into SMERSH and transferred to the People's Defense and Commissariates. At the same time, the NKVD was reduced in size and duties again by converting the GUGB to an independent unit named the NKGB.

In 1946, all Soviet Commissariats were renamed "ministries". Accordingly, the Peoples Commissariat of Internal Affairs (NKVD) of the USSR became the Ministry of Internal Affairs (MVD), while the NKGB was renamed as the Ministry of State Security (MGB).

In 1953, after the arrest of Lavrenty Beria, the MGB merged back into the MVD. The police and security services finally split in 1954 to become:

 The USSR Ministry of Internal Affairs (MVD), responsible for the criminal militia and correctional facilities.
 The USSR Committee for State Security (KGB), responsible for the political police, intelligence, counter-intelligence, personal protection (of the leadership) and confidential communications.

Main Directorates (Departments)
 State Security
 Workers-Peasants Militsiya
 Border and Internal Security
 Firefighting security
 Correction and Labor camps
 Other smaller departments
 Department of Civil registration
 Financial (FINO)
 Administration
 Human resources
 Secretariat
 Special assignment

Ranking system (State Security)
In 1935–1945 Main Directorate of State Security of NKVD had its own ranking system before it was merged in the Soviet military standardized ranking system.
Top-level commanding staff
 Commissioner General of State Security (later in 1935)
 Commissioner of State Security 1st Class
 Commissioner of State Security 2nd Class
 Commissioner of State Security 3rd Class
 Commissioner of State Security (Senior Major of State Security, before 1943)
Senior commanding staff
 Colonel of State Security (Major of State Security, before 1943)
 Lieutenant Colonel of State Security (Captain of State Security, before 1943)
 Major of State Security (Senior Lieutenant of State Security, before 1943)
Mid-level commanding staff
 Captain of State Security (Lieutenant of State Security, before 1943)
 Senior Lieutenant of State Security (Junior Lieutenant of State Security, before 1943)
 Lieutenant of State Security (Sergeant of State Security, before 1942)
 Junior Lieutenant of State Security (Sergeant of State Security, before 1942)
Junior commanding staff
 Master Sergeant of Special Service (from 1943)
 Senior Sergeant of Special Service (from 1943)
 Sergeant of Special Service (from 1943)
 Junior Sergeant of Special Service (from 1943)

NKVD activities 
The main function of the NKVD was to protect the state security of the Soviet Union. This role was accomplished through massive political repression, including authorised murders of many thousands of politicians and citizens, as well as kidnappings, assassinations and mass deportations.

Domestic repressions

In implementing Soviet internal policy towards perceived enemies of the Soviet state ("enemies of the people"), untold multitudes of people were sent to GULAG camps and hundreds of thousands were executed by the NKVD. Formally, most of these people were convicted by NKVD troikas ("triplets")– special courts martial. Evidential standards were very low: a tip-off by an anonymous informer was considered sufficient grounds for arrest. Use of "physical means of persuasion" (torture) was sanctioned by a special decree of the state, which opened the door to numerous abuses, documented in recollections of victims and members of the NKVD itself. Hundreds of mass graves resulting from such operations were later discovered throughout the country. Documented evidence exists that the NKVD committed mass extrajudicial executions, guided by secret "plans". Those plans established the number and proportion of victims (officially "public enemies") in a given region (e.g. the quotas for clergy, former nobles etc., regardless of identity). The families of the repressed, including children, were also automatically repressed according to NKVD Order no. 00486.

The purges were organized in a number of waves according to the decisions of the Politburo of the Communist Party.  Some examples are the campaigns among engineers (Shakhty Trial), party and military elite plots (Great Purge with Order 00447), and medical staff ("Doctors' Plot"). Gas vans were used in the Soviet Union during the Great Purge in the cities of Moscow, Ivanovo and Omsk

A number of mass operations of the NKVD were related to the persecution of whole ethnic categories. For example, the Polish Operation of the NKVD in 1937–1938 resulted in the execution of 111,091 Poles. Whole populations of certain ethnicities were forcibly resettled. Foreigners living in the Soviet Union were given particular attention. When disillusioned American citizens living in the Soviet Union thronged the gates of the U.S. embassy in Moscow to plead for new U.S. passports to leave the USSR (their original U.S. passports had been taken for 'registration' purposes years before), none were issued. Instead, the NKVD promptly arrested all the Americans, who were taken to Lubyanka Prison and later shot. American factory workers at the Soviet Ford GAZ plant, suspected by Stalin of being 'poisoned' by Western influences, were dragged off with the others to Lubyanka by the NKVD in the very same Ford Model A cars they had helped build, where they were tortured; nearly all were executed or died in labor camps. Many of the slain Americans were dumped in the mass grave at Yuzhnoye Butovo District near Moscow. Even so, the people of the Soviet Republics still formed the majority of NKVD victims.

The NKVD also served as arm of the Russian Soviet communist government for the lethal mass persecution and destruction of ethnic minorities and religious beliefs, such as the Russian Orthodox Church, the Ukrainian Orthodox Church, the Roman Catholic Church, Greek Catholics, Islam, Judaism and other religious organizations, an operation headed by Yevgeny Tuchkov.

International operations

During the 1930s, the NKVD was responsible for political murders of those Stalin believed to oppose him. Espionage networks headed by experienced multilingual NKVD officers such as Pavel Sudoplatov and Iskhak Akhmerov were established in nearly every major Western country, including the United States. The NKVD recruited agents for its espionage efforts from all walks of life, from unemployed intellectuals such as Mark Zborowski to aristocrats such as Martha Dodd. Besides the gathering of intelligence, these networks provided organizational assistance for so-called wet business, where enemies of the USSR either disappeared or were openly liquidated.

The NKVD's intelligence and special operations (Inostranny Otdel) unit organized overseas assassinations of political enemies of the USSR, such as leaders of nationalist movements, former Tsarist officials, and personal rivals of Joseph Stalin. Among the officially confirmed victims of such plots were:

 Leon Trotsky, a personal political enemy of Stalin and his most bitter international critic, killed in Mexico City in 1940;
 Yevhen Konovalets, prominent Ukrainian nationalist leader who was attempting to create a separatist movement in Soviet Ukraine; assassinated in Rotterdam, Netherlands
Yevgeny Miller, former General of the Tsarist (Imperial Russian) Army; in the 1930s, he was responsible for funding anti-communist movements inside the USSR with the support of European governments. Kidnapped in Paris and brought to Moscow, where he was interrogated and executed
 Noe Ramishvili, Prime Minister of independent Georgia, fled to France after the Bolshevik takeover; responsible for funding and coordinating Georgian nationalist organizations and the August uprising, he was assassinated in Paris
 Boris Savinkov, Russian revolutionary and anti-Bolshevik terrorist (lured back into Russia and allegedly killed in 1924 by the Trust Operation of the GPU);
 Sidney Reilly, British agent of the MI6 who deliberately entered Russia in 1925 trying to expose the Trust Operation to avenge Savinkov's death;
 Alexander Kutepov, former General of the Tsarist (Imperial Russian) Army, who was active in organizing anti-communist groups with the support of French and British governments

Prominent political dissidents were also found dead under highly suspicious circumstances, including Walter Krivitsky, Lev Sedov, Ignace Reiss, and former German Communist Party (KPD) member Willi Münzenberg.

The pro-Soviet leader Sheng Shicai in Xinjiang received NKVD assistance in conducting a purge to coincide with Stalin's Great Purge in 1937. Sheng and the Soviets alleged a massive Trotskyist conspiracy and a "Fascist Trotskyite plot" to destroy the Soviet Union. The Soviet Consul General Garegin Apresoff, General Ma Hushan, Ma Shaowu, Mahmud Sijan, the official leader of the Xinjiang province Huang Han-chang, and Hoja-Niyaz were among the 435 alleged conspirators in the plot. Xinjiang came under soviet influence.

Spanish Civil War

During the Spanish Civil War, the NKVD ran Section X coordinating the Soviet intervention on behalf of the Spanish Republicans. NKVD agents, acting in conjunction with the Communist Party of Spain, exercised substantial control over the Republican government, using Soviet military aid to help further Soviet influence. The NKVD established numerous secret prisons around the capital Madrid, which were used to detain, torture, and kill hundreds of the NKVD's enemies, at first focusing on Spanish Nationalists and Spanish Catholics, while from late 1938 increasingly anarchists and Trotskyists were the objects of persecution. In 1937, Andrés Nin, the secretary of the Trotskyist POUM and his colleagues were tortured and killed in an NKVD prison in Alcalá de Henares.

World War II operations

Prior to the German invasion, in order to accomplish its own goals, the NKVD was prepared to cooperate even with such organizations as the German Gestapo. In March 1940, representatives of the NKVD and the Gestapo met for one week in Zakopane, to coordinate the pacification of Poland; see Gestapo–NKVD conferences. For its part, the Soviet Union delivered hundreds of German and Austrian Communists to the Gestapo, as unwanted foreigners, together with their documents. However, many NKVD units were later to fight the Wehrmacht, for example the 10th NKVD Rifle Division, which fought at the Battle of Stalingrad.

After the German invasion, the NKVD evacuated and killed prisoners. During World War II, NKVD Internal Troops units were used for rear area security, including preventing the retreat of Soviet Union army divisions. Though mainly intended for internal security, NKVD divisions were sometimes used at the front to stem the occurrence of desertion through Stalin's Order No. 270 and Order No. 227 decrees in 1941 and 1942, which aimed to raise troop morale via brutality and coercion. At the beginning of the war the NKVD formed 15 rifle divisions, which had expanded by 1945 to 53 divisions and 28 brigades. Though mainly intended for internal security, NKVD divisions were sometimes used in the front-lines, for example during the Battle of Stalingrad and the Crimean offensive. Unlike the Waffen-SS, the NKVD did not field any armored or mechanized units.

In the enemy-held territories, the NKVD carried out numerous missions of sabotage. After the fall of Kyiv, NKVD agents set fire to the Nazi headquarters and various other targets, eventually burning down much of the city center. Similar actions took place across the occupied Byelorussia and Ukraine.

The NKVD (later KGB) carried out mass arrests, deportations, and executions. The targets included both collaborators with Germany and non-communist resistance movements such as the Polish Home Army and the Ukrainian Insurgent Army aiming to separate from the Soviet Union, among others. The NKVD also executed tens of thousands of Polish political prisoners in 1940–1941, including the Katyń massacre. On 26 November 2010, the Russian State Duma issued a declaration acknowledging Stalin's responsibility for the Katyn massacre, the execution of 22,000 Polish POWs and intellectual leaders by Stalin's NKVD. The declaration stated that archival material "not only unveils the scale of his horrific tragedy but also provides evidence that the Katyn crime was committed on direct orders from Stalin and other Soviet leaders."

NKVD units were also used to repress the prolonged partisan war in Ukraine and the Baltics, which lasted until the early 1950s. NKVD also faced strong opposition in Poland from the
Polish resistance known as the Armia Krajowa.

Postwar operations

After the death of Stalin in 1953, the new Soviet leader Nikita Khrushchev halted the NKVD purges. From the 1950s to the 1980s, thousands of victims were legally "rehabilitated" (i.e., acquitted and had their rights restored). Many of the victims and their relatives refused to apply for rehabilitation out of fear or lack of documents. The rehabilitation was not complete: in most cases the formulation was "due to lack of evidence of the case of crime". Only a limited number of persons were rehabilitated with the formulation "cleared of all charges".

Very few NKVD agents were ever officially convicted of the particular violation of anyone's rights. Legally, those agents executed in the 1930s were also "purged" without legitimate criminal investigations and court decisions. In the 1990s and 2000s (decade) a small number of ex-NKVD agents living in the Baltic states were convicted of crimes against the local population.

Intelligence activities
These included:

 Establishment of a widespread spy network through the Comintern.
 Operations of Richard Sorge, the "Red Orchestra", Willi Lehmann, and other agents who provided valuable intelligence during World War II.
 Recruitment of important UK officials as agents in the 1940s.
 Penetration of British intelligence (MI6) and counter-intelligence (MI5) services.
 Collection of detailed nuclear weapons design information from the U.S. and Britain during the Manhattan Project.
 Disruption of several confirmed plots to assassinate Stalin.
 Establishment of the People's Republic of Poland and earlier its communist party along with training activists, during World War II. The first President of Poland after the war was Bolesław Bierut, an NKVD agent.

Soviet economy 

The extensive system of labor exploitation in the Gulag made a notable contribution to the Soviet economy and the development of remote areas. Colonization of Siberia, the Far North, and the Far East was among the explicitly stated goals in the very first laws concerning Soviet labor camps. Mining, construction works (roads, railways, canals, dams, and factories), logging, and other functions of the labor camps were part of the Soviet planned economy, and the NKVD had its own production plans.

The most unusual part of the NKVD's achievements was its role in Soviet science and arms development. Many scientists and engineers arrested for political crimes were placed in special prisons, much more comfortable than the Gulag, colloquially known as sharashkas. These prisoners continued their work in these prisons, and later released, some of them became world leaders in science and technology. Among such sharashka members were Sergey Korolev, the head designer of the Soviet rocket program and first human space flight mission in 1961, and Andrei Tupolev, the famous airplane designer. Aleksandr Solzhenitsyn was also imprisoned in a sharashka, and based his novel The First Circle on his experiences there.

After World War II, the NKVD coordinated work on Soviet nuclear weaponry, under the direction of General Pavel Sudoplatov. The scientists were not prisoners, but the project was supervised by the NKVD because of its great importance and the corresponding requirement for absolute security and secrecy. Also, the project used information obtained by the NKVD from the United States.

People's Commissars
The agency was headed by a people's commissar (minister). His first deputy was the director of State Security Service (GUGB).
 1934–1936 Genrikh Yagoda, both people's commissar of Interior and director of State Security
 1936–1938 Nikolai Yezhov, people's commissar of Interior
 1936–1937 Yakov Agranov, director of State Security (as the first deputy)
 1937–1938 Mikhail Frinovsky, director of State Security (as the first deputy)
 1938 Lavrentiy Beria, director of State Security (as the first deputy)
 1938–1945 Lavrentiy Beria, people's commissar of Interior
 1938–1941 Vsevolod Merkulov, director of State Security (as the first deputy)
 1941–1943 Vsevolod Merkulov, director of State Security (as the first deputy)
 1945–1946 Sergei Kruglov, people's commissar of Interior
Note: In the first half of 1941 Vsevolod Merkulov transformed his agency into separate commissariat (ministry), but it was merged back to the people's commissariat of Interior soon after the Nazi invasion of the Soviet Union. In 1943 Merkulov once again split his agency this time for good.

Officers
Andrei Zhukov has singlehandedly identified every single NKVD officer involved in 1930s arrests and killings by researching a Moscow archive. There are just over 40,000 names on the list.

See also

 
 Poison laboratory of the Soviet secret services
 10th NKVD Rifle Division
 Hitler Youth conspiracy, an NKVD case pursued in 1938
 NKVD filtration camp
 NKVD special camps in Germany 1945–49, internment camps set up at the end of World War II in eastern Germany (often in former Nazi POW or concentration camps) and other areas under Soviet domination, to imprison those suspected of collaboration with the Nazis, or others deemed to be troublesome to Soviet ambitions.

References

Further reading
See also:  and

External links
 
 For evidence on Soviet espionage in the United States during the Cold War, see the full text of Alexander Vassiliev's Notebooks from the Cold War International History Project (CWIHP)
 NKVD.org: information site about the NKVD
  MVD: 200-year history of the Ministry
  Memorial: history of the OGPU/NKVD/MGB/KGB 

NKVD
Law enforcement agencies of the Soviet Union
Soviet intelligence agencies
Defunct law enforcement agencies of Russia
Defunct intelligence agencies
People's commissariats and ministries of the Soviet Union
Intelligence services of World War II
Law enforcement in communist states
Human rights in the Soviet Union
National security institutions
Political repression in the Soviet Union
Secret police
1934 establishments in Russia
1934 establishments in the Soviet Union
1946 disestablishments in the Soviet Union
Government agencies established in 1934
Government agencies disestablished in 1946
Civil rights and liberties
Freedom of expression
Imprisonment and detention
Internments